Word: Live at Carnegie Hall is a live album by comedian Louis C.K. It was produced independently and sold directly through the comedian's website for the cost of US$5.00. Much of the material appeared on the second season of Louie, as well as his appearances on Conan and The Tonight Show. Because he planned to use it in the show, he opted not to release the standup album until after the season was complete, meaning it was released after Live at the Beacon Theater although Word was recorded earlier.

C.K. re-released the audio-only album for download on his website in April 2020.

Track listing

References

Further reading

2012 live albums
2010s comedy albums
Stand-up comedy albums
2010s spoken word albums
Albums recorded at Carnegie Hall
Live spoken word albums
Louis C.K. albums
Self-released albums
Spoken word albums by American artists